The Shaheed Zulfiqar Ali Bhutto University of Law (SZABUL) is a Public University situated in Karachi, Sindh, Pakistan. SZABUL has unique privilege to be the first ever Law University in Pakistan. It is recognized by the Higher Education Commission (Pakistan) and Pakistan Bar Council. It offers B.A LL.B. (5 years), BS Criminology (4 years), Bachelors of Business Administration (BBA 4 years, 2 years), LL.M and PHD programs.
Justice (R) Qazi Khalid Ali was the founding vice chancellor appointed in 2013. Mr. Justice (R) Rana Muhammad Shamim is the current vice chancellor of the university appointed by the chief minister for a four-year term in September 2019.

Detailed introduction

Shaheed Zulfiqar Ali Bhutto University of Law was established by the Govt. of Sindh through enactment of Shaheed Zulfiqar Ali Bhutto University of Law Karachi Act, 2012 (Sindh Act XIII of 2013). The faculty at SZABUL consists of PHD holding professors, retired judges, senior Advocates, bureaucrats and foreign educated barristers. The University's city campus is situated near 3 Talwar in Clifton,Khaliq-u-zama road Karachi. Shaheed Benazir campus of the University which expands to the area of about 50 Acres has been newly established in Korangi Karachi. Moreover the Government of Sindh has also promised to allot a 250 Acres of land in Education city at Link Road between National Highway and Super Highway Karachi for Main Campus. The construction of the Hostels for boys and girls are projected to be completed by 2023. In future, SZABUL will also run diploma and certificate courses in various fields of law, and allied specialties. In December 2021, three students from SZABUL; Muzamil Ahmed, Sami Ullah & Sania Kazi represented the University at 36th edition of the Jean Pictet Competition in International Law held in Albania. The team was the first to lead SZABUL in an overseas competition. The Team was funded by GM Qureshi Law Associates.

References

External links 
 Here is Some Fresh Jobs 2021
 SZABUL official website
 SZABUL Jobs Form 2021

Educational institutions established in 2013
2013 establishments in Pakistan
Public universities and colleges in Sindh
Universities and colleges in Karachi
Memorials to Zulfikar Ali Bhutto